Vasile Șeicaru (born 10 July 1951 in Galați) is a Romanian folk musician. In the past he has worked with Cenaclul Flacăra.

See also
List of Romanian musicians
Music of Romania

References

External links
 

Living people
1951 births
People from Galați
Romanian folk singers